María Teodora Adoracion ("Dori") Ruano Sanchón (born 11 January 1969) is a retired female track and road racing cyclist from Spain. She represented her native country at three Summer Olympics: in 1992, 2000, and 2004. Her biggest achievement was winning the world title in the women's points race at the 1998 UCI Track Cycling World Championships.

References

External links

1969 births
Living people
Spanish female cyclists
Cyclists at the 1992 Summer Olympics
Cyclists at the 2000 Summer Olympics
Cyclists at the 2004 Summer Olympics
Olympic cyclists of Spain
Sportspeople from Salamanca
UCI Track Cycling World Champions (women)
Spanish track cyclists
Cyclists from Castile and León